Colne is a civil parish in Pendle, Lancashire, England.  It contains 45 listed buildings that are recorded in the National Heritage List for England.  Of these, one is listed at Grade I, the highest of the three grades, two are at Grade II*, the middle grade, and the others are at Grade II, the lowest grade.

The parish contains the town of Colne and surrounding countryside.  Before the arrival of the cotton industry, it was mainly agricultural, and most of the earlier listed buildings are farmhouses, farm buildings, and other houses,  Industry is represented by the surviving Primet Foundry.  The Leeds and Liverpool Canal runs through the western part of the parish, and the listed buildings associated with it are locks, a bridge, the entrance to a tunnel, and a lock cottage.  The other listed buildings include two crosses, a church, a public house, former schools, a toll house, shops, the town hall, almshouses, memorials, and telephone kiosks.

Key

Buildings

References

Citations

Sources

Lists of listed buildings in Lancashire
Buildings and structures in the Borough of Pendle
Listed